Johnny No-Trump is a play written by Mary Mercier which ran for one performance on Broadway.

Productions
Johnny No-Trump opened at the Cort Theatre on October 8, 1967 and ran for  5 previews and one regular performance. Directed by Joseph Hardy, it starred James Broderick, Sada Thompson, Pat Hingle, Don Scardino and, making her Broadway debut, Bernadette Peters.

Johnny No Trump was revived by the Equity Library Theater (New York) in 1970, The Cleveland Play House in 1972, and Iglesia's Theater Club (New York) in 1975.

Synopsis
Johnny, a teen-aged young man, tries to come to terms with himself and his family. He wants to leave school to be a poet, to the dismay of his schoolteacher mother. The play takes place in February 1965, in a small Long Island, New York town. The characters consist of 16-year-old Johnny Edwards; Florence Edwards, his mother; Alexander Edwards, her estranged husband; Harry Armstrong, Johnny's uncle; and Bettina, a "very grown-up" 15-year-old neighbor.

Reception
In his review in The New York Times, critic Clive Barnes wrote: "There are times when the characters...seem to be talking with absolute truthfulness...within seconds the play... is offering slick gibberish." Barnes wrote after it closed "...I regret [it] was abruptly taken off by its producer before it had a chance to get a word-of-mouth resuscitation." Walter Kerr, also in The New York Times, wrote that Mercier "is plainly talented, she is already capable of a blunt and crackling speech that insists upon being listened to. ...  To compound the disaster, the production was superior at every level: director Joseph Hardy displayed a fresh sensibilty that coaxed an altogether unfamiliar reality – at once supple and hardheaded – out of a familiar kind of domestic crisis. ...  There was ample treasure worth finding."  

The play has been discussed in several books, including Shoptalk: Conversations About Theater and Film With Twelve Writers by Dennis Brown (1993); Broadway's Beautiful Losers by Marilyn Stasio (1972); On Stage: The Making of a Broadway Play by Susan Jacobs (1967); and The Season by William Goldman (1969).  Goldman calls Johnny No-Trump "The best new American play of the season". 

One of the producers, Richard Barr, in announcing the closing, stated: "The fact that the critics did not appreciate that this play was so far above the level...of almost any American play for the past few seasons indicates to me that there is a great struggle ahead for sensitive, intelligent, talented playwrights."

William Goldman later wrote that the play struggled because it arrived in New York "so quietly":
It had no power connected with it. Sada Thompson was not then Sada Thompson. And Pat Hingle was what he always is, which is a good, solid actor, but he doesn't sell tickets like Rosalind Russell. So the critics were allowed to pick at it. The same play, word for word, wouldn't have been any better done if it had come in as a David Merrick production, with Elia Kazan directing, and a star. But it's my contention that if the play had come in with power, then people would have overlooked any flaws, because those who saw it were so moved by it.

Notes

References
Brown, Dennis.  Shoptalk: Conversations About Theater and Film with Twelve Writers, One Producer–and Tennessee Williams' Mother (1992), Newmarket Press, 
Goldman, William. The Season: A Candid Look at Broadway, (1969), p. 67 Hal Leonard Corporation,  (1969)
Jacobs, Susan. On Stage: The Making of a Broadway Play (1967) Alfred A. Knopf
Stasio, Marilyn. Broadway's Beautiful Losers (1973, ©1972), New York, Dell

External links

 (archive) at Playbill
Synopsis

1967 plays